The 1908 Chicago Maroons football team was an American football team that represented the University of Chicago during the 1908 college football season. In their 17th season under head coach Amos Alonzo Stagg, the Maroons compiled a 5–0–1 record, won the Western Conference championship, and outscored opponents by a total of 132 to 30.

Quarterback Walter Steffen was the team captain. Four Chicago players received first-team honors on the 1908 All-Western college football team: end Harlan Page, halfback William Lucas Crawley, fullback, Oscar William Worthwine, and center Benjamin Harrison Badenoch.

Schedule

Roster

Head coach: Amos Alonzo Stagg (17th year at Chicago)

References

Chicago
Chicago Maroons football seasons
Big Ten Conference football champion seasons
College football undefeated seasons
Chicago Maroons Football